Pierina Nicoll Núñez Cordero (born 13 March 2000) is a Peruvian professional footballer who plays as a forward for Spanish Segunda Federación club Real Betis B and the Peru women's national team. She also appears in the Spanish Liga F with the Real Betis first team.

Club career
On 25 June 2019, Núñez was announced by Peruvian Football Federation as a player of Spanish club Logroño.

International career
Núñez represented Peru at two South American U-17 Women's Championship editions (2013 and 2016) and three South American U-20 Women's Championship editions (2014, 2015 and 2018). At senior level, she played the 2018 Copa América Femenina and the 2019 Pan American Games.

References

External links
Pierina Núñez at BDFútbol

2000 births
Living people
People from Piura
Peruvian women's footballers
Women's association football forwards
Club Universitario de Deportes footballers
Sporting Cristal footballers
EdF Logroño B players
EdF Logroño players
Real Betis Féminas players
Primera División (women) players
Segunda Federación (women) players
Peru women's international footballers
Pan American Games competitors for Peru
Footballers at the 2019 Pan American Games
Peruvian expatriate footballers
Peruvian expatriate sportspeople in Spain
Expatriate women's footballers in Spain
21st-century Peruvian women